The Order of the Spanish Republic (Spanish: "Orden de la República Española") was founded in 1932 in the Second Spanish Republic for civil and military merit to the state. It replaced the orders of merit of the former Spanish Monarchy and had the mural crown instead of the royal one.

The order had the usual five degrees. There was a special collar for heads of state and two medals were attached to this order of merit. The ribbon was red with a white border.

After the military defeat of the Spanish Republic, Gen. Francisco Franco abolished all Republican Orders and instituted new ones. The Spanish Republican government in exile issued one order which was a simple medal with a ribbon in the Spanish republican colors.

Gallery

See also
Laureate Plate of Madrid
Madrid Distinction

References

External links
Segunda República (1931-1939)

Awards and decorations of the Second Spanish Republic